The Timahdit oil shale deposit is an oil shale deposit located about  southeast of Rabat near Timahdite, Fès-Meknès, Morocco. It is the second largest oil-shale deposit in Morocco. Geologically, it comprises two basins: El koubbat and Angueur synclines.

The deposit is estimated to consist of 42 billion tons of oil shale, containing  of shale oil. Its moisture content is 6–11% and sulfur content is about 2%. On average it yields  of shale oil per one ton of oil shale. As the Timahdit deposit is located near Ifrane National Park and Haut-Atlas Oriental National Park, oil extraction is an environmentally sensitive issue.

The Timahdit deposit was discovered during the 1960s.  The deposit was researched and tested during the 1970s and 1980s.  The Moroccan Office of Hydrocarbons and Mining (ONHYM) developed and tested a shale oil extraction process called T3 which in 1984–1986  produced approximately 400 tons of shale oil at Timahdit.

References 

Oil shale deposits in Morocco